The Canmore Eagles are a junior A ice hockey team in the Alberta Junior Hockey League (AJHL). They play in Canmore, Alberta, Canada at the Canmore Recreation Centre.

History
The Eagles franchise was established for the 1995–96 season as the Bow Valley Eagles.  The franchise was renamed as the Canmore Eagles prior to the 2001–02 season.

Season-by-season record
Note: GP = Games played, W = Wins, L = Losses, T/OTL = Ties/Overtime losses, SOL = Shootout losses, Pts = Points, GF = Goals for, GA = Goals against

NHL alumni
The following former Eagles have gone on to play in the National Hockey League (NHL):
Dan Blackburn
Darcy Campbell
Shane Joseph
Brayden Point

Other notable alumni
Mark Bomersback – AJHL All-time leading scorer
Brock Michalsky – AJHL All-time leading Iron Man for number of total games played

See also
 List of ice hockey teams in Alberta

References

External links
Canmore Eagles website
Alberta Junior Hockey League website

Alberta Junior Hockey League teams
Ice hockey teams in Alberta
Ice hockey clubs established in 1995
1995 establishments in Alberta
Canmore, Alberta